Arnaud-François Lefèbvre (21 December 1709 – 27 March 1760) served as the Apostolic Vicar of Cochin (1741–1760).

Biography
Arnaud-François Lefèbvre was born in Calais, France and was an ordained priest of the Société des Missions étrangères de Paris. On 6 October 1741, Pope Benedict XIV appointed him Apostolic Vicar of Cochin and Titular Bishop of Nea Aule. On 6 January 1743 he was consecrated bishop by Jean de Lolière-Puycontat, Apostolic Vicar of Siam. He served as Apostolic Vicar of Cochin until his death on 27 March 1760.

While bishop, he was the principal consecrator of Edmond Bennetat, Coadjutor Vicar Apostolic of Cochin and Titular Bishop of Eucarpia (1748).

References

1709 births
1760 deaths
French Roman Catholic titular bishops
Paris Foreign Missions Society missionaries
18th-century Roman Catholic bishops in Vietnam
French Roman Catholic bishops in Asia
Bishops appointed by Pope Benedict XIV
Roman Catholic missionaries in Vietnam
French expatriates in Vietnam